Bob McLean (27 September 1947 – 9 April 2015), was an Australian winemaker. He died of liver cancer on 9 April 2015.

References

1947 births
2015 deaths
Australian winemakers